Magda Amo Rius (born July 23, 1973, in Barcelona) is a track and field athlete and a ski athlete from Spain.  She is  blind.  She is a B2 type skier. She competed at the 1992 Winter Paralympics, winning a bronze in the giant slalom race. She raced at the 1994 Winter Paralympics, earning a silver in the downhill race.  She jumped at the 1996 Summer Paralympics. She jumped the farthest in the long jump. She skied at the 1998 Winter Paralympics and won a gold in the Giant, Super Giant, Slalom and Downhill races.

References 

Living people
1973 births
Paralympic gold medalists for Spain
Paralympic silver medalists for Spain
Paralympic bronze medalists for Spain
Sportspeople from Barcelona
Alpine skiers at the 1992 Winter Paralympics
Alpine skiers at the 1994 Winter Paralympics
Athletes (track and field) at the 1996 Summer Paralympics
Alpine skiers at the 1998 Winter Paralympics
Medalists at the 1992 Winter Paralympics
Medalists at the 1994 Winter Paralympics
Medalists at the 1998 Winter Paralympics
Spanish female alpine skiers
Spanish female long jumpers
Spanish disability athletes
Sportswomen with disabilities
Paralympic medalists in alpine skiing
Paralympic alpine skiers of Spain
Visually impaired long jumpers
Paralympic long jumpers